Philetus Sawyer (September 22, 1816March 29, 1900) was a United States senator from Wisconsin for twelve years (1881–1893).  He also represented Wisconsin for ten years in the United States House of Representatives (1865–1875), and he was the 9th mayor of Oshkosh, Wisconsin.  Sawyer County, Wisconsin, is named for him.

Biography

Philetus Sawyer was born in 1816 in Whiting, Vermont, and moved to Crown Point, New York, as an infant in 1817. He moved to Wisconsin in 1847 and worked in the lumber industry. Sawyer's early political career included serving in the Wisconsin State Assembly in 1857 and 1861, and as mayor of Oshkosh, Wisconsin, from 1863 to 1864. He ran for and was elected to the United States House of Representatives in 1864 and served for ten years from 1865 until 1875 being first elected to the 39th United States Congress. From 1865 till 1873 he was the representative of Wisconsin's 5th congressional district. However, for the 43rd Congress he redistricted and represented Wisconsin's 6th district. He did not run for reelection in 1874. Sawyer returned to Congress in 1881 as a U.S. Senator. He served two terms from 1881 to 1893 and did not seek a third.  However, he became notorious for a charge made against him by Congressman Robert La Follette Sr. that he had attempted to bribe La Follette.

Sawyer died in 1900 in Oshkosh at age 83. He was interred at a family mausoleum at Riverside Cemetery in Oshkosh.

References

External links

Republican Party members of the Wisconsin State Assembly
Mayors of places in Wisconsin
Politicians from Oshkosh, Wisconsin
1816 births
1900 deaths
People from Whiting, Vermont
Republican Party United States senators from Wisconsin
Republican Party members of the United States House of Representatives from Wisconsin
People from Crown Point, New York
19th-century American politicians